Gmina Lądek-Zdrój is an urban-rural gmina (administrative district) in Kłodzko County, Lower Silesian Voivodeship, in south-western Poland.

Neighbouring gminas
Gmina Lądek-Zdrój is bordered by the gminas of Bystrzyca Kłodzka, Kłodzko, Stronie Śląskie and Złoty Stok. It also borders the Czech Republic.

Villages
Apart from the town of Lądek-Zdrój, the gmina contains the villages of Kąty Bystrzyckie, Konradów, Lutynia, Orłowiec, Radochów, Skrzynka, Stójków, Trzebieszowice and Wójtówka.

Twin towns – sister cities

Gmina Lądek-Zdrój is twinned with:

 Bad Schandau, Germany
 Bernartice, Czech Republic
 Bílá Voda, Czech Republic
 Goedereede, Netherlands
 Javorník, Czech Republic
 Klášterec nad Orlicí, Czech Republic
 Otmuchów, Poland
 Paczków, Poland
 Svitavy, Czech Republic
 Uhelná, Czech Republic
 Vlčice, Czech Republic
 Złoty Stok, Poland

References

Ladek-Zdroj
Gmina Ladek Zdroj